The 2020–21 Zamalek SC season was the club's 110th season in existence and the 62nd consecutive season in the top flight of Egyptian football. In addition to the domestic league, Zamalek participated in this season's editions of the Egypt Cup and the CAF Champions League.

Players

Out on loan

Competitions

Overall record

Egyptian Premier League

League table

Results summary

Results by round

Matches 
The league fixtures were announced on 23 November 2020.

Egypt Cup

Egyptian Super Cup

CAF Champions League

Qualifying rounds 

The draw for the qualifying rounds was held on 9 November 2020.

First round

Group stage 

The draw for the group stage was held on 8 January 2021.

References

Zamalek SC seasons
Zamalek